Lewis Preston may refer to:
Lewis Thompson Preston, former President of the World Bank
Lewis Preston (basketball), American college basketball coach